The Sanremo Music Festival 1968 was the 18th annual Sanremo Music Festival, held at the Sanremo Casino in Sanremo, province of Imperia, Italy, between 1 and 3 February 1968.

The show was presented by Pippo Baudo, assisted by actress Luisa Rivelli.
  
According to the rules of this edition every song was performed in a double performance by a couple of singers or groups. The winners of the Festival were  Sergio Endrigo and Roberto Carlos with the song "Canzone per te".

Participants and results

References 

Sanremo Music Festival by year
1968 in Italian music
1968 music festivals